Damian of Pavia (also Damianus Ticinensis, Damianus Mediolanensis, Damianus Biscossia) was Bishop of Pavia (Ticinum) from 680, succeeding bishop Anastasius. He mediated relations between the Lombards and the Byzantine emperors.

Damian wrote a letter to emperor Constantine IV  in 679 on behalf of Mansuetus, archbishop of Milan, against the doctrine of Monothelitism. This letter, in a Latin edition, is the only extant writing from the hand of Damian (sometimes attributed to Mansuetus on whose behalf Damian was writing).

References

Ferdinando Ughelli, Italia sacra sive de episcopis Italae vol. 1 (1643), p. 1082.
ed. Migne, Epistola Damiani sub nomine Mansueti Mediolanensis Archieiscopi ad Constantinum Imperatorem, Patrologia Latina vol. 87.

External links
St. Damian Catholic Online
Saint Damian of Pavia CatholicSaints.info

7th-century births
710 deaths
8th-century Italian bishops
7th-century Italian bishops
Bishops of Pavia
Italian Roman Catholic saints
7th-century Latin writers
Latin letter writers
7th-century Italian writers